"Gum Drop" is a popular song written by Rudy Toombs.

The recording by The Crew-Cuts was released by Mercury Records as catalog number 70668. It first reached the Billboard magazine charts on August 27, 1955. On the Disk Jockey chart, it peaked at #14; on the Best Seller chart, at #10; on the Juke Box chart, at #20; on the composite chart of the top 100 songs, it reached #80. The peak at #80 on the top-100 list is misleading, however,  because this list was begun after the song had reached its popularity peak, so it was headed off the list at that point. The flip side was "Present Arms" on some copies and "Song Of The Fool" on others.

The original recording was by Otis Williams and the Charms (credited as "Otis Williams and His New Group"), released by De Luxe Records in June 1955 as catalog number 45-6090.

References

1955 singles
Mercury Records singles
The Crew-Cuts songs
Songs written by Rudy Toombs
1955 songs